Ling-Ding Tower, is a skyscraper office building located in West District, Taichung, Taiwan. The building was completed in 1994 and was one of the earliest skyscrapers in Taichung. The fourth floor of the building houses the Taipei Language Institute's Taichung campus. As of January 2021, the building is the 34th tallest in Taichung.

See also 
 List of tallest buildings in Taiwan
 List of tallest buildings in Taichung
 Shr-Hwa International Tower

External links 
Ling-Ding Tower Official Page

References

1994 establishments in Taiwan
Office buildings completed in 1994
Skyscraper office buildings in Taichung